The 1978 Football Championship of Ukrainian SSR was the 48th season of association football competition of the Ukrainian SSR, which was part of the Soviet Second League in Zone 2. The season started on 2 April 1978.

The 1978 Football Championship of Ukrainian SSR was won by Metalist Kharkiv.

The "Ruby Cup" of Molod Ukrayiny newspaper (for the most scored goals) was received by SKA Kiev.

Teams

Location map

Relegated teams
Kryvbas Kryvyi Rih – (returning after two seasons)

Relocated teams
 Start Tiraspol replaced Speranța Drochia  (returning after eight seasons absence, previously as Dnestr Tiraspol in 1969)

Renamed teams
 FC Khvylya Khmelnytskyi changed its name to FC Podillya Khmelnytskyi.

Final standings

Top goalscorers
The following were the top ten goalscorers.

See also
 Soviet Second League

Notes

References

External links
 1979 Soviet Second League, Zone 2 (Ukrainian SSR football championship). Luhansk football portal
 1978 Soviet championships (all leagues) at helmsoccer.narod.ru

1978
3
Soviet
Soviet
football
Football Championship of the Ukrainian SSR